R39 may refer to:

 R39 (New York City Subway car)
 R39 (South Africa), a road
 , a destroyer of the Royal Navy
 R39: Danger of very serious irreversible effects, a risk phrase
 R-39 Rif, a Soviet submarine-launched ballistic missile